Jag fortsätter glömma (Swedish for I continue to forget) is the first solo album by Joakim Berg. It was released on 27 May 2022. It debuted atop the Swedish albums chart on 3 June 2022.

Track listing

Personnel
Joakim Berg – lyrics, music, production
Martin Sköld – music on track 10
Michael Ilbert – mixer
Björn Engelmann – mastering

Charts

Weekly charts

Year-end charts

References

2022 albums
Swedish-language albums